Tharcisse Renzaho (born 17 July 1944) is a Rwandan soldier, former politician and war criminal. He is best known for his role in the 1994 genocide against the Tutsi.

Renzaho was born in the Gaseta sector of the Kigarama commune, in the Rwandan prefecture of Kibungo. He was educated as a military engineer in various academies in Germany, France and Belgium. After returning to Rwandan he rose to the rank of colonel in the Rwandan Armed Forces.

In 1990, he entered politics.  An ethnic Hutu, he was a part of Juvénal Habyarimana's dominant MRND party. He became governor of the prefecture of Kigali-ville, and president of the Civil Defence Committee for Kigali.

According to the prosecutor for the International Criminal Tribunal for Rwanda (ICTR), Renzaho is alleged to have contributed to the genocide in numerous ways between 7 April and July 1994, including exercising his authority to set up roadblocks for the interception and murder of Tutsis, dismissing councillors who objected to the genocide, personally ordering the detainment and murder of Tutsis, equipping genocidaires with Kalashnikov rifles, and ordering the murder of the journalist André Kameya.

Following the collapse of the interim government and the victory of the RPF, Renzaho fled to Zaire.

He was arrested on 26 September 2002 in the Democratic Republic of Congo, and was turned over the ICTR on 29 September.

On 14 July 2009 the ICTR sentenced Renzaho to life in prison. On 1 April 2011 the Appeals Chamber confirmed Renzaho's sentence.

References

External links 
 U.S. State Department statement on Renzaho's arrest
 Rwanda genocide suspect held by tribunal, Daily Telegraph, October 1, 2002

Rwandan soldiers
Rwandan politicians
1944 births
Living people
National Republican Movement for Democracy and Development politicians
People convicted by the International Criminal Tribunal for Rwanda
Rwandan people convicted of genocide
Prisoners sentenced to life imprisonment by international courts and tribunals
Rwandan prisoners sentenced to life imprisonment
Rwandan expatriates in the Democratic Republic of the Congo
People extradited from the Democratic Republic of the Congo
Hutu people
Rwandan politicians convicted of crimes